Randy Grau (born December 3, 1975) is an American politician who served in the Oklahoma House of Representatives from the 81st district from 2010 to 2016.

References

1975 births
Living people
Republican Party members of the Oklahoma House of Representatives